The Unified Northern Alphabet (UNA) was created during the Latinisation in the Soviet Union for the "small" languages of the North.

Systematic work on the development of writing in the languages of the peoples of the North began in 1926, when the Northern Faculty (known as the Institute of the Peoples of the North (IPN) since 1930) of the Leningrad Oriental Institute (ru) was established.

The alphabet was initially planned to serve as an alphabet for Chukchi, Even, Evenki, Gilyak, Itelmen, Ket, Koryak, Mansi, Nanai, Nenets, Saami, Selkup, Siberian Yupik and Udihe.

Alphabet

Letters in use across different languages

Further development 
Since 1932, textbooks began to be published in the UNA. The UNA was used for 15 out of the 16 planned languages (all except Aleutian).

After 1937, the UNA was abandoned, and those languages that were to continue to have an official writing system were to adopt Cyrillic. In practice, this spelt the end of writing for many of these minority languages this halted their written use for decades to come.

References 
 Grenoble, L. A. (2003). Language policy in the Soviet Union (Vol. 3). Springer Science & Business Media.
 Partanen, N.; M. Rießler (2019). An OCR system for the Unified Northern Alphabet. ACL Anthology.

Latin alphabets
Romanization